Transmit Security is a private cybersecurity and identity and access management company based in Tel Aviv, Israel and Boston, Massachusetts. Founded by Mickey Boodaei and Rakesh Loonkar in 2014, Transmit Security provides companies with customer authentication, identity orchestration, and workforce identity management services. In June 2021, the company completed a Series A funding round by raising $543 million, which was reported to be the largest Series A in cybersecurity history. Transmit Security is a FIDO Alliance Board member.

History

Transmit Security was co-founded in 2014 by Mickey Boodaei and Rakesh Loonkar. Boodaei and Loonkar previously founded Trusteer in 2006, which was acquired by IBM in 2013 for $1 billion.

In November 2020, Transmit Security ranked 5th on Deloitte's "North America Technology Fast 500", a list of the fastest-growing tech companies in North America.

In February 2021, Transmit Security joined the FIDO Alliance Board.

In June 2021, Transmit Security completed its Series A funding round by raising $543 million from investors. It was reported to be the largest Series A in cybersecurity history. Primary investors included Insight Partners and General Atlantic, with additional investment from Cyberstarts, Geodesic, SYN Ventures, Vintage and Artisanal Ventures. In September 2021, Citi Ventures and Goldman Sachs Asset Management joined as investors.

Operations
Transmit Security’s main headquarters is located in Tel Aviv, Israel. Its North American headquarters is in Boston, Massachusetts. Additional offices are located in London, Berlin, Tokyo, Hong Kong, Madrid, Sao Paulo, and Mexico City.

See also
 Secret Double Octopus
 List of unicorn startup companies

References 

Security companies of Israel
Security companies of the United States
Software companies of Israel
Software companies established in 2014
Identity management systems
Federated identity
Cloud applications
Password authentication
Computer security software companies